Diego Zuppel (born 13 October 2002) is an Italian football player. He plays for  club Messina on loan from Spezia.

Club career
He made his professional Serie C debut for Arezzo on 27 September 2021 in a game against Feralpisalò.

In August 2021, he joined Serie A club Spezia and was assigned to their Under-19 (primavera) squad. He was also included in the senior team's roster.

On 1 August 2022, Zuppel was loaned to Messina.

References

External links
 
 

2002 births
People from Castiglione del Lago
Footballers from Umbria
Living people
Italian footballers
Association football forwards
S.S. Arezzo players
Spezia Calcio players
A.C.R. Messina players
Serie C players
Sportspeople from the Province of Perugia